Gold Standard Laboratories or GSL was an independent record label which was founded in 1993 in Boulder, Colorado by Sonny Kay. In 2000, it was relocated to San Diego, California, United States, and two years later, to Los Angeles. It was headquartered in L.A. until closing its doors on October 29, 2007.

Beginning in 2001, GSL was co-owned by The Mars Volta's Omar Rodríguez-López.

Artists 
Bands appearing on GSL:

 !!!
 400 Blows
 '57 Lesbian
 A Luna Red
 An Albatross
 Anavan
 Arab On Radar
 Armatron
 Attractive and Popular
 Beautiful Skin
 Big Sir
 Bunny Genghis
 Chromatics
 Crime in Choir
 Coaxial
 The Convocation Of...
 Cut City
 Dead and Gone
 De Facto
 Die Princess Die
 Demonstrations
 Fatal Flyin' Guillotines
 The Faint
 Favourite Sons
 Free Moral Agents
 Get Hustle
 GoGoGo Airheart
 Heart of Snow
 The Holy Kiss
 I Am Spoonbender
 Indian Jewelry
 Jaga Jazzist
 The Jai-Alai Savant
 JR Ewing
 Juhl
 Kill Me Tomorrow
 Le Shok
 The Locust
 Lost Kids
 Malcriada
 The Mars Volta
 Meanface
 Melt-Banana
 Mohinder
 Neon King Kong
 Omar A. Rodríguez-López
 Omega Cinco
 Out Hud
 The Pattern
 The Phantom Limbs
 Physics
 Pleasure Forever
 The Rapture
 Red Eyed Legends
 Rhythm of Black Lines
 SABERTOOTH . TIGER
 Semiautomatic
 Soiled Doves
 The Starlite Desperation
 The Starvations
 The Stitches
 Subpoena the Past
 Subtitle
 Sunshine
 Tender Buttons
 Triclops!
 The Vanishing
 Vaz
 Veronica Lipgloss & The Evil Eyes
 The VSS
 Vue
 With Love
 Woodpussy
 XBXRX
 Xiu Xiu
 Year Future

References

External links
 

American independent record labels
Record labels established in 1993
Record labels disestablished in 2007
Alternative rock record labels
Defunct companies based in Greater Los Angeles
1993 establishments in Colorado
2007 disestablishments in California